The men's marathon event at the 1978 Commonwealth Games was held on 
11 August 1978  in Edmonton, Alberta, Canada.

Results

References

Athletics at the 1978 Commonwealth Games
1978
Comm
1978 Commonwealth Games